The Provisional Army of the United States was a rump military force maintained by the United States of America between May 1798 and June 1800.

History
The Provisional Army of the United States was created as a second standing army to exist simultaneously with the United States Army, mainly because of political concerns about increasing the size of the latter force. Raised following the outbreak of an undeclared war between the United States and France, its term of enlistment, unlike that of the United States Army, was only for the duration of the "existing differences between the United States and the French Republic". Further, despite being a federal force, it had soldiers who were not permitted to serve outside the states in which they were recruited; in that respect, it was it similar to the state militias.

The Fifth Congress authorized US President John Adams to raise the Provisional Army between its 1798 summer recess and its reassembly the following winter. However, Adams had commissioned only seven officers before his authority to recruit personnel to the Provisional Army expired. No meaningful recruiting had occurred and new legislation was enacted to create yet another army, the Eventual Army of the United States, to which all of the Provisional Army's empty regiments were transferred.

The Provisional Army of the United States was officially dissolved on June 15, 1800.

Organization
The commanding officer of the Provisional Army was George Washington, who was commissioned at the rank of lieutenant general and to the post of "Commander in Chief of all the Armies of the United States," which gave him titular authority over both the Provisional Army of the United States and the United States Army. The aging Washington accepted the appointment conditional to his ability to remain in secluded retirement at Mount Vernon until he was actually needed. The Provisional Army's other officers included Major General Alexander Hamilton (Inspector General), Brigadier General William North (Adjutant General), and Dr. James Craik (Physician General).

On paper, the Provisional Army was organized into one cavalry regiment and twelve infantry regiments.

By the beginning of 1799 the officers had been appointed and in May 1799 recruiting began. By the time the Provisional Army was disbanded in June 1800, about 4,100 men had been mobilized, assembled in camps, and given from six to twelve months' training. Hamilton directed the preparation of new drill regulations to replace Steuben's, but before the task was finished the French crisis had ended and the Provisional Army was discharged.

The Mid Atlantic 12th, 13th and 14th regiments were organized into the Union Brigade and encamped in huts they erected in Plainfield New Jersey in the fall of 1799 until the disbandment in June 1800.  The New England regiments were similarly encamped in Massachusetts and the southern regiments at Harper’s Ferry.

See also
 Army of the United States
 United Nations Command-Rear

Notes

References

1798 establishments in the United States
Military of the United States
1800 disestablishments in the United States
Presidency of John Adams
George Washington